Bentley Church railway station was located in Suffolk, the village of Bentley. It opened in 1846 and closed in 1853.

References

Disused railway stations in Suffolk
Former Great Eastern Railway stations
Railway stations in Great Britain opened in 1846
Railway stations in Great Britain closed in 1853
1846 establishments in England
Babergh District]